Radio Musicola is a song by English pop singer Nik Kershaw. It was released as the third single from his third studio album of the same name. 

The release was the eleventh of Kershaw's career and was his third single to fail to reach the UK Singles Chart Top 40, peaking at #43.

Track listing
7" single (MCA NIK 11)
A. "Radio Musicola" – 4:16
B. " L.A.B.A.T.Y.D." – 4:12

12" single (MCA NIKT 11)
A. "Radio Musicola" (Extended Mix) – 7:15
B1. "L.A.B.A.T.Y.D." – 4:12	
B2. "Radio Musicola" – 4:16

Personnel
Credits are adapted from the album's liner notes.
 Nik Kershaw – lead and background vocals; guitars; keyboards; computers
 Andy Richards – keyboards; computers
 Paul "Wix" Wickens – keyboards
 Tim Sanders – tenor saxophone; soprano saxophone
 Simon Clarke – alto saxophone; flute
 Roddy Lorimer – flugelhorn; trumpet
 Steve Sidwell – trumpet
 Peter Thoms – trombone
 Iva Davies – backing vocals
 Miriam Stockley – backing vocals
 Stevie Lange – backing vocals
 Gary Dyson – backing vocals
 Sheri Kershaw – backing vocals

Charts

References

External links
 

1986 singles
1986 songs
Nik Kershaw songs
Songs written by Nik Kershaw
MCA Records singles